Victorine Agum Fomum (born June 17, 1974 in Bamenda) is a Cameroonian table tennis player. Fomum represented Cameroon at the 2008 Summer Olympics in Beijing, where she competed in the women's singles. She lost the first preliminary round match to Dominican Republic's Lian Qian, with a unanimous set score of 0–4.

References

External links
NBC 2008 Olympics profile

Cameroonian table tennis players
Table tennis players at the 2008 Summer Olympics
Olympic table tennis players of Cameroon
1974 births
Living people
People from Bamenda